Mungbere is a small town in Haut-Uele province, in the north of the Democratic Republic of Congo.

Transport 

It was served by the terminal of a now non-operational  narrow gauge railway from Bumba, known as the Vicicongo line.

See also 

 List of railway stations in the Democratic Republic of the Congo

References

External links 
 Mungbere on Openstreetmap

Populated places in Haut-Uélé